Seo Hyun-jin (born February 27, 1985) is a South Korean actress and singer. Seo debuted as the main vocalist of South Korean girl group M.I.L.K. in 2001 and continued until the group disbanded in 2003. She contributed songs as a solo artist after the group disbandment before she transitioned into acting in 2006.

Seo made her acting debut in the musical The Sound of Music (2006) then followed by appearances in several television series and film. She is best known for her leading role as Oh Hae-young in the romantic comedy TV series Another Miss Oh (2016), which gained her wider recognition. Seo has since gone on to have main cast billing in medical melodrama  Dr. Romantic (2016–2017), romance dramas Temperature of Love (2017), The Beauty Inside (2018), and You Are My Spring (2021), and legal drama Why Her (2022).

Life and career

1985–2005: Early life and music career
Seo was born on February 27, 1985, in Dobong District (now Nowon District), Seoul, South Korea. She was scouted by S.M. Entertainment and later debuted as the main vocalist of South Korean girl group, M.I.L.K in 2001, under the label's subsidiary BM Entertainment. However, the group soon fell by the wayside due to fierce competition among manufactured bands, which led to one of the members quitting before they completely disbanded in 2003. After M.I.L.K. was dissolved, Seo attended Dongduk Women's University, where she majored in applied musicology to keep her dream of singing career alive. Seo contributed songs to a few soundtracks and SM Town compilations as a solo artist.

2006-2014: Acting debut and further roles

Seo had the chance to perform in her first musical, The Sound of Music in 2006, which she saw as the turning point in her acting career.

Supporting roles followed in the period drama Hwang Jini (2006), TV police procedural H.I.T (2007), and the queer film Ashamed (2011). Seo first drew attention for her subtler performance in The Duo (2011), as a neighborhood tomboy who later becomes a gisaeng. She played her first villain in Feast of the Gods (2012), as an overly ambitious chef caught in a rivalry. Seo was then cast in leading roles for two historical dramas The King's Daughter, Soo Baek-hyang (2013) and The Three Musketeers (2014).

Seo has also frequently appeared in projects directed by her best friend, actress Ku Hye-sun, notably in the short film The Madonna and in the feature film Magic, in which she had her first leading role.

2015–present: Rising popularity

Seo said the character that most resembled her real-life personality was the foodie freelance writer in Let's Eat 2 (2015), adding that she "didn't realize how much fun shooting a lively and comical drama could be." The drama was Seo's first attempt at romantic-comedy genre, in which she got good reviews and it became her career's turning point.

Her popularity grew rapidly after the hit romance comedy drama Another Miss Oh (2016), which she starred alongside Eric Mun. She was praised for her portrayal of such an ordinary and relatable character, and won the Baeksang Arts Award for Best Actress. Later in the same year, she starred in SBS hit medical drama Dr. Romantic alongside Han Suk-kyu and Yoo Yeon-seok. In 2017, Seo starred in the romance television series Temperature of Love penned by Ha Myung-hee.

In 2018, Seo was cast in the fantasy melodrama The Beauty Inside which is based on the 2015 romantic comedy film of the same name. She played an actress who spends a week out of each month living in someone else's body. She then starred in the high school television series Black Dog: Being A Teacher in 2019 and tvN drama series You Are My Spring in 2021.

In 2022, Seo starred in the SBS legal drama Why Her in the titular role of Oh Soo-jae, a lawyer-turned-professor and in the film Cassiopeia as a daughter  who is diagnosed with Alzheimer's disease and slowly turning into a young child due to loss of memory.

Other activities
In 2019, Seo was recognised as an exemplary tax payer by the National Tax Service of South Korea and was named as an honorary ambassador together with Lee Je-hoon.

Filmography

Film

Television series

Television show

Music video appearances

Theater

Discography

Singles

Awards and nominations

State honors

Listicles

References

External links 

 Seo Hyun-jin on Management SOOP
 

1985 births
Living people
South Korean women pop singers
South Korean female idols
21st-century South Korean actresses
South Korean film actresses
South Korean television actresses
People from Seoul
Actresses from Seoul
Singers from Seoul
Dongduk Women's University alumni
21st-century South Korean singers
21st-century South Korean women singers
Best Actress Paeksang Arts Award (television) winners